Erkan Avcı (born 17 December 1982) is a Turkish actor.

Life and career 
Avcı is a graduate of economics from Bilikent University . He has also studied MBA from Ankara University . He started his acting career in 2006 by making his television debut in the series Köprü. He received critical acclaim for his role as Ahmet in the movie Zenne, for which he received the Best Supporting Actor Award at the 48th International Antalya Golden Orange Film Festival. He rose to prominence with his portrayal of the character Barut Necdet in the series Karadayı. He is also known for his roles as Çeto in Çukur and Aya Nikola in Kuruluş: Osman.

Filmography

Film

TV series

Awards

References

External links 

1982 births
Turkish male television actors
Turkish male film actors
People from Diyarbakır
Ankara University alumni
Living people